Uprising is an American 2001 war drama television film about the Warsaw Ghetto Uprising during the Holocaust. The film was directed by Jon Avnet and written by Avnet and Paul Brickman. It was first aired on the NBC television network over two consecutive nights in November 2001.

Plot
On 1 September 1939, Germany invades Poland, after which a regulation was promulgated that all Polish Jews should move to the new Warsaw Ghetto. As in all the ghettos, a Judenrat was appointed and was responsible for the administration of the ghetto. The film tells the moral dilemmas faced by Adam Czerniaków, head of the Judenrat in the Warsaw Ghetto, who had to carry out orders of the German authorities, including sending Jews to the Treblinka extermination camp.

A group of Polish Jews decide to rebel against the Germans and not to lend a hand to the murder of their brethren. They begin to organize their people to protect the honor of the Jewish people. Czerniaków, as the leader of the Judenrat, objects to this activity, fearing German reprisals against the Jews in the ghetto.  By the close of 1942, people living in the ghetto realize they are doomed as deportations to Treblinka began. The rudiments of resistance are planned by Mordechai Anielewicz together with Yitzhak Zuckerman who laid the foundation for the Jewish Combat Organization, Zydowska Organizacja Bojowa (ZOB).

The film illustrates the moral dilemmas of members of the Jewish Combat Organization during the preparations for the revolt: "How to remain moral, in an immoral society?" On January 18, 1943, Nazis raid the ghetto again but this time the Jews resist. The Jewish Combat Organization stops the Nazi raids into the ghetto. Germans return on 18 April 1943, and the Warsaw Ghetto Uprising begins. In the intervening time, many of the ghetto residents construct hidden shelters or bunkers in the basements and cellars of the buildings, often with tunnels leading to other buildings. The handful of fighters who have weapons take to these shelters, giving the uprising the advantage of defensive positions.

Cast
 Leelee Sobieski as Tosia Altman
 Hank Azaria as Mordechai Anielewicz
 David Schwimmer as Yitzhak "Antek" Zuckerman
 Jon Voight as Maj. Gen. Jürgen Stroop
 Donald Sutherland	as Adam Czerniaków
 Stephen Moyer as Simcha "Kazik" Rotem
 Sadie Frost as Zivia Lubetkin
 Radha Mitchell as Mira Fuchrer
 Mili Avital as Devorah Baron
 Eric Lively as Arie Wilner
 Alexandra Holden as Frania Beatus
 John Ales as Marek Edelman
 Andy Nyman as Calel Wasser
 Nora Brickman as Clara Linder
 Jesper Christensen as Gen. Friedrich Krüger
 Cary Elwes as Dr. Fritz Hippler
 Palle Granditsky as Dr. Janusz Korczak
 Hannah Hetzer as Girl in Trench

Filming
The movie was filmed in multiple locations, including Bratislava, Slovakia and Innsbruck in Tyrol, Austria.

Music
The film's soundtrack was the last film score composed by Maurice Jarre, and prominently features the work of Max Bruch, including his Violin Concerto No. 1 during the opening sequence.

Alternate titles
The French title for the film is 1943, l'ultime révolte. The German title for the film is Uprising: Der Aufstand. The Polish title for the film is Powstanie.

Accolades
In 2002, the film received the following awards:
Primetime Emmy Award for Best Stunt Coordination category 
American Society of Cinematographers Award for Outstanding Achievement in Cinematography in Movies of the Week/Mini-Series/Pilot (Network)
Christopher Award for Television & Cable
Golden Reel Award for Best Sound Editing in Television - Dialogue & ADR, Long Form
Political Film Society Awards for Exposé

See also
Mila 18
 List of Holocaust films
 Vladka Meed

References

External links

2000s war drama films
2001 films
2001 television films
American television films
American war drama films
Films directed by Jon Avnet
Films scored by Maurice Jarre
Films shot in Slovakia
Holocaust films
Warsaw Ghetto Uprising
World War II films based on actual events
American World War II films
2000s American films
Films about Polish resistance during World War II
Films about Jewish resistance during the Holocaust
World War II television films